Christine Angot (born 7 February 1959) is a French novelist, playwright and screenwriter.

Life
Born Pierrette Marie-Clotilde Schwartz (Schwartz being her mother's name) in Châteauroux, Indre, she is perhaps best known for her 1999 novel L'Inceste (Incest) which recounts an incestuous relationship with her father. 
It is a subject which appears in several of her previous books, but it is unclear whether these works are autofiction, and whether the events described actually took place. Angot herself describes her work – a metafiction on society's fundamental prohibition of incest and her own writings on the subject – as performative acts. (cf Quitter la ville).

She was named the winner of the Prix Sade in 2012 for Une semaine de vacances.

In 2021, she was awarded the Prix Médicis for her novel Le Voyage dans l'Est.

In collaboration with director Claire Denis, she has written two films: Let the Sunshine In (2017) and Both Sides of the Blade (2022). Both Sides of the Blade is based on her novel Un tournant de la vie (2018).

Selected works

Novels 
 Vu du ciel (1990)
 Not to be (1991)
 Léonore, toujours (1994)
 Interview (1995)
 Les Autres (1997)
 Sujet Angot (1998)
 L'Usage de la vie incluant Corps plongés dans un liquide, Même si et Nouvelle vague (1998)
 L'Inceste (1999)
 Quitter la ville (2000)
 Normalement suivi de La Peur du lendemain (2001)
 Pourquoi le Brésil ? (2002)
 Peau d'âne (2003)
 La Désaxes (2004)
 Une partie du cœur (2004)
 Rendez-vous (2006)
 Othoniel (2006)
 Le Marché des amants (2008)
 Les Petits (2011)
 La Petite Foule (2014)
 Un amour impossible (2015)
 Un tournant de la vie (2018)
 Le Voyage dans l'Est (2021)

Plays 
 Corps plongés dans un liquide (1992)
 Nouvelle vague (1992)
 Même si (1996)
 L'Usage de la vie  (1997)
 Arrêtez, arrêtons, arrête (1997)
 Mais aussi autre chose (1999)
 La Fin de l'amour (2000)
 Meinhof/Angot  (2001)
 Normalement (2002)
 La Place du singe (2005)

References

1959 births
Living people
People from Châteauroux
French women dramatists and playwrights
French women novelists
21st-century French non-fiction writers
20th-century French dramatists and playwrights
21st-century French dramatists and playwrights
College of Europe alumni
Prix Décembre winners
Prix France Culture winners
Officiers of the Ordre des Arts et des Lettres
21st-century French women writers
20th-century French women writers
Prix Médicis winners
French women screenwriters
21st-century French screenwriters